Igor Kashurov (Russian: Игорь Кашуров; born 3 April 1951) is a Soviet rower. He competed at the 1972 Summer Olympics in Munich with the men's coxless four where they came fourth.

References

1951 births
Living people
Soviet male rowers
Olympic rowers of the Soviet Union
Rowers at the 1972 Summer Olympics